I'm Only a Man is the third album released by the post-hardcore band Emery.

Release
Emery debuted some tracks from I'm Only a Man while touring with Underoath in summer 2007, and on July 29, 2007, they released "The Party Song," which was followed by "Rock-N-Rule" on August 16, "After the Devil Beats His Wife" on September 17, and "Don't Bore Us, Get to the Chorus" on September 24, 2007. Four days later the album was leaked onto the internet in its entirety.

Style changes
Emery's style shifted even further from their debut than had The Question. The sound of I'm Only a Man is much more accessible and less aggressive than their past records.

Due to bassist Joel Green's departure from Emery prior to the making of I'm Only a Man, guitarist Matt Carter decided to maintain simple guitar parts in comparison to prior releases, instead having the album rely mainly on the bass and keyboard to be the musical focus.

Track listing

 Bonus DVD
 Documentary
 Take Action Tour: Lawrence, KS. March 10, 2007
 1. The Ponytail Parades
 2. The Movie Song
 3. Walls
 4. Playing with Fire
 5. Rock-N-Rule
 6. In a Win, Win Situation
 7. So Cold I Could See My Breath
 8. Studying Politics
 Acoustic Tour: Lawrence, KS. July 19, 2007
 1. Listening to Freddie Mercury
 2. Fractions
 3. Don't Bore Us, Get to the Chorus
 4. The Ponytail Parades
 5. What Makes a Man a Man
 6. Anne Marie
 7. World Away
 8. Playing with Fire
 9. As Your Voice Fades
 10. In a Win, Win Situation
 11. Studying Politics
 12. White Christmas
 13. Walls

Personnel
Credits adapted from AllMusic:

Emery
Toby Morrell – co-lead vocals
Josh Head – unclean vocals, keyboards, synthesizers, programming, piano
Matt Carter – lead guitar, bass, backing vocals
Devin Shelton – rhythm guitar, co-lead vocals
Dave Powell – drums

Production
Ryan Boesh – engineer, mixing, producer
Matt Carter – engineer, mixing, producer
Troy Glessner – mastering
Dan Korneff – mixing
J.R. McNeely – mixing
Ryan Clark – design
Jerad Knudson – photography

I’m Only A Man - Studio Update and Live Version (2020-2021)
In 2020, Emery completely re-recorded, remixed and remastered the whole album from scratch and released it exclusively on vinyl as I'm Only a Man (Studio Update).

On September 27, 2021, I'm Only a Man (Studio Update), live albums I'm Only A Man (Live Version) and The Weak's End (Live Version) were released for streaming services via BC Music.

References

2007 albums
I'm Only a Man (Emery album)
I'm Only a Man (Emery album)